93.5 Eagle FM is a contemporary hit music station based in Goulburn, Australia and broadcasting to the Southern Tablelands region of New South Wales on 93.5 FM. Eagle FM is a part of the Capital Radio Network.

About 
Eagle FM launched on 31 January 1997 as the subsequent FM licence to Goulburn's commercial station on AM, 2GN (now GNFM).

The station is owned in a near 50–50 joint venture between Capital Radio Network and Grant Broadcasters trading as Goulburn Radio Broadcasters Pty. Ltd. The station shares its branding and music with fellow Capital Radio Network station Snow FM.

Eagle FM's Goulburn studios ("Radio Goulburn") are shared with sister station GNFM (formerly 2GN). The building is located on the corner of Lagoon and Union streets. Eagle FM is primarily played out from Studio A. Goulburn Radio Broadcasters is also responsible for broadcasting Grant Broadcasters' national hot country network, KIX Country, in the Southern Tablelands.

Eagle FM has a repeater in Crookwell, re-transmitting Eagle FM on 103.9 MHz.

History 
Eagle FM's Twitter account is the 77th oldest among Australian radio stations.

The station's playout software is Zetta from RCS, having previously used Master Control also an RCS product.

In April 2020, the COVID-19 pandemic prevented local Anzac Day services proceeding. In response to this, Eagle FM and 2GN provided a dawn service airing just prior to 6am programming.

On 31 October 2020, Eagle FM's Dylan and Matthew 'MJ' Brokenbrough broadcast live for 24 hours straight in support of Goulburn's Relay For Life which had changed their usual event due to coronavirus. This event was nominated for a Goulburn Australia Day 2021 award in the 'Event of The Year' category.

Programs 
Eagle FM broadcasts a number of local and syndicated hosted programs:

Local Announcers 
 Gemma Sweeney (Workdays, 2021-)
 Jacob Aquilina (Breakfast, 2021-)
 Jenna D'Apice (Workdays, 2021)
Matthew 'MJ' Brokenbrough (Breakfast, 2019-2021)
 Dylan Finch (Workdays, 2018-2021)
 James Preston (Breakfast, 2018–2019)
Bill 'Billy' Bradley (Breakfast, 2016–2018)
Jack Wallance (2016-2018)
Damien Haffenden (2013-2014)
Murray Ryan (2013)
Dene Broadbelt (2012-2013)
Andrew Mata (2010-2013)
Joe (Joey) Groth (2011-2011)
Rick Shipp (2008)
Jason McLean (2000-2002)
Dan Cassin (1998)
Andy Young
Blair Woodcock
Ryan Nicholls
Luke 'Crossy' Cross

Awards and recognition 
 2021, Eagle FM has been nominated for an Australia Day award in the Event of The Year category, for their 'Radio Relay' Broadcast marathon in 2020.
2020, Eagle FM won the Goulburn Chamber of Commerce & Industry's Business 2580 Award for Best Media & Entertainment Company.
 2019, Dylan Finch was a finalist in the Australian Commercial Radio Awards (ACRA's) for 'Best Achievement In Production'.
2017, Bill Bradley won the ACRA for 'Best Newcomer On-Air', country market
2016's ACRA's saw Eagle FM's Andy Young win Best Entertainment/Music Presenter (Country)
2002, Jason McLean won the ACRA for Best Music Personality and Best music special.
2001, Jason McLean won the Raward for Best Music personality.

See also 
 GNFM
 Snow FM
 Capital Radio Network
 Commercial Radio Australia

References

Radio stations in New South Wales
Capital Radio Network
Grant Broadcasters